Essential Mix is a mix album by Pete Tong, Carl Cox, Sasha and Paul Oakenfold (all credited mononymously), released on 23 November 1995 through Tong's FFRR. The album charted on the UK Compilation Chart at position 22, and was certified gold by the British Phonographic Industry in 2013.

Track listing

Charts

Certifications

References

1995 compilation albums